Professional Engineers Ontario (PEO; known until 1993 as the Association of Professional Engineers of Ontario, APEO) is the self-regulatory body that governs Ontario's 85,000 professional engineers, and sets standards for and regulates engineering practice in the province. It is "the licensing and regulating body for professional engineering in the province".

PEO was created on June 15, 1922. It has a statutory mandate under the Professional Engineers Act of Ontario to protect the public interest where engineering is concerned, and is also mandated with educating its members about latest research and best practices developments, and maintaining a Code of Ethics that puts the public interest first. Licensed professional engineers are identified by the P.Eng. after their names.

PEO consists of 36 chapters, each representing a different geographic area in Ontario. PEO is governed by a Council of 29 members, of which 17 are elected by the licence holders and 12 are appointed by the provincial government. The organization has collaborated with the Ontario Society of Professional Engineers since 1947 to recognize professional engineers in Ontario who have made outstanding contributions to their profession and their community through the Ontario Professional Engineers Awards (OPEA).

Self-Sustaining Family Habitation competition

In August 1976, the Association sponsored a "Self-Sustaining Family Habitation Design Competition" through its Mission for Mankind program.   The competition was open to all members of the APEO, OACETT and to students of engineering and technology in Ontario.  The competition called for the design of components for a completely self-sustaining family habitation, that would generate its own heat and energy from the sun and wind, recycle its own waste material and grow its own food. Submissions were expected to employ the latest technology, seek simplicity, utilize natural resources and materials on the site and to look for comfort and adaptability.

The winning entry was submitted by Paul D. Tinari, a first year student in Engineering at Queen's University, Kingston, Ontario.  He was the youngest entrant, aged 18.  Tinari selected as his basic structure a spherical shape, constructed of interlocking, pre-fabricated concrete slabs, properly sealed and covered with a layer of earth 1 m deep, then sodded, with spherical greenhouse domes on the south-facing elevations, also used for food production.  The judges noted that this simple design provided maximum strength/weight ratios, minimum surface/volume ratios, minimum foundation requirements and easy and rapid on-site assembly. The heat source consisted of solar collectors, and heat was stored in a device containing molten wax and water. The design also contained a wind generator and battery storage. Household waste was processed in a biodigester, and the resulting methane gas was used as another energy source.

President and Past Presidents 
The Professional Engineers Ontario Council consists of both elected professional engineers and "members appointed by the office of the Attorney General of Ontario". A president is elected each year, who is president-elect for one year, president for one year (see list below), and then past president for one year, serving for a total of three years on the PEO governing council. The PEO website gives the names of presidents prior to 2000.

2022-23 Nick Colucci

2021-22 Christian Bellini

2020-21 Marisa Sterling

2019-2020 Nancy Hill

2018 David Brown

2017 R.D. (Bob) Dony

2016 George Comrie

2015 Thomas Chong

2014 J. David Adams

2013 Annette Bergeron

2012 Denis Dixon

2011 J. David Adams

2010 Diane L. Freeman

2009 Catherine Karakatsanis

2008 David Adams

2007 Walter Bilanski

2006 Patrick Quinn

2005 Robert (Bob) Goodings

2004 George Comrie

2003 Ken McMartin

2002 Richard W. Braddock

2001 G. Gordon M. Sterling

2000 Peter M. DeVita

References

External links

Engineering societies based in Canada
Professional associations based in Ontario